Jogeshwari East Assembly constituency is one of the 26 Vidhan Sabha constituencies located in the Mumbai Suburban district.

Jogeshwari East is part of the Mumbai North West Lok Sabha constituency along with five other Vidhan Sabha segments, namely Goregaon, Versova, Dindoshi, Andheri West and Andheri West in the Mumbai Suburban district.

Members of Legislative Assembly

Election results

2019 result

2014 result

2009 result

References

Assembly constituencies of Mumbai
Politics of Mumbai Suburban district
Assembly constituencies of Maharashtra